I'm Up may refer to:

Albums 
I'm Up, Vol. 1, 2009 mixtape by Lumidee
I'm Up (Gucci Mane mixtape), 2012
I'm Up (Young Thug mixtape), 2016

Songs 
 "I'm Up", a song by Lumidee from her 2007 album Unexpected
 "I'm Up" (song), a 2015 single by Omarion ft. French Montana and Kid Ink
 "I'm Up", a song by YoungBoy Never Broke Again from his 2020 album Top
 "I'm Up", a song by Nav from the album Brown Boy 2